Harry and the Wrinklies is a British children's drama series based on a novel of the same name by Alan Temperley. It was produced for three series by STV and aired on CITV from 11 May 2000 to 12 December 2002. The show starred Nick Robinson in the role of Harry.

Synopsis
When Harry's parents die on holiday, he is adopted by his aunts. These aunts run an old folks' home where every inhabitant is a retired criminal or scam artist, and these "Wrinklies," in a new twist on the Robin Hood tale, routinely commit various crimes in order to donate large sums of money to charity. The Wrinklies' archenemies were a corrupt judge Percy "Beastly" Priestly and his monstrous fiancée Lavina McScrew aka Gestapo Lil. Harry has a dog called Tangle.

In the second series, Lil brings along her niece Katie to spy on the Wrinklies and to befriend Harry. In the third and final series, Percy invites his brother Piggy to help out with his and Lil's scheming plans while Percy is in prison.

Cast
Harry Barton - Nick Robinson
Percy "Beastly" Priestly - Gareth Hunt
Lavinia "Gestapo Lil" McScrew - Briony McRoberts
Aunt Bridget - Mona Bruce
Aunt Florie - Elsie Kelly
Dot - Toni Palmer
Huggy - George Sewell
Max - Victor Spinetti
Katie - Emma Durkin (Series 2–3)
Piggy Priestly - Tyler Butterworth (Series 3)
Freddie - John Quentin (Series 3)

Episode Guide

Series 1

Series 2
(Originally Broadcast: 4 May to 15 May 2001)
Episode 1 - 'The Mayor's Story'
Episode 2 - 'The Bank's Story'
Episode 3 - 'Hobnail's Story'
Episode 4 - 'The Painting Story'
Episode 5 - 'Ron's Story'
Episode 6 - 'The Diamond Story'
Episode 7 - 'The Flashbacks' - selection of clips from S1 and S2

Series 3
(Originally Broadcast: 24 October to 12 December 2002 on ITV)

By the start of Series 3 Percy Priestly is in Prison and his brother Mr Piggy stays with Lil McScrew to try to get the better of the Wrinklies.

Episode 1 - 'Introducing Mr. Piggy'
Episode 2 - 'Hobnail In Love'
Episode 3 - 'Where's My Mummy?'
Episode 4 - 'Madame Acarte'
Episode 5 - 'Great Movie Scam'
Episode 6 - 'Great Hospital Robbery'
Episode 7 - 'Great Pantomime'
Episode 8 - 'Great TV Show'

NOTE: Since its original broadcast, Series 1 has not been repeated since. Series 2 and 3 have been repeated on and off occasions since February 2007 on the CITV channel. Series 1 has been repeated (in a single, omnibus, edition) by STV and as a Christmas 'special' on STV Glasgow in 2014 and 2015.

Merchandise
Harry and The Wrinklies - VHS (1999)
Harry and The Wrinklies - Book - Written By Alan Temperley (1997)
Harry and The Treasure Of Eddie Carver - Book - Written By Alan Temperley

External links

2000 British television series debuts
2002 British television series endings
2000s British children's television series
ITV children's television shows
ITV comedy
Television shows produced by Scottish Television
English-language television shows